FIFA Futbol Mundial was a football-related magazine show produced by IMG Sports Media in conjunction with FIFA. It ran from 1994 to at least 2014. FIFA maintained a YouTube playlist of the same name until 2016.

The show was started in 1994 by former ITV football commentator Gerry Harrison, with Stewart Binns as executive producer. The initial production team was Peter Matthew Hutton, Guy Oliver, Jamie Baker, Tony Williamson and Michael Stolz. The show has been produced every week from that date and is seen throughout the world. There have been several other shows that have tried to cover similar ground over the years – including the Octagon show Western Union World Football and the FIFA show FIFA TV. However, Futbol Mundial has outlasted all of them. It was normally broadcast on Tuesdays then repeated during the rest of the week.

International airings

References

External links
Official Website
Press release stating viewership

Association football television series
Futbol Mundial